A differential equation can be homogeneous in either of two respects. 

A first order differential equation is said to be homogeneous if it may be written

In this case, the change of variable  leads to an equation of the form 

which is easy to solve by integration of the two members.

Otherwise, a differential equation is homogeneous if it is a homogeneous function of the unknown function and its derivatives. In the case of linear differential equations, this means that there are no constant terms. The solutions of any linear ordinary differential equation of any order may be deduced by integration from the solution of the homogeneous equation obtained by removing the constant term.

History

The term homogeneous was first applied to differential equations by Johann Bernoulli in section 9 of his 1726 article De integraionibus aequationum differentialium (On the integration of differential equations).

Homogeneous first-order differential equations 

A first-order ordinary differential equation in the form:

That is, multiplying each variable by a parameter , we find

Thus,

Solution method
In the quotient , we can let  to simplify this quotient to a function  of the single variable :

That is 

Introduce the change of variables ; differentiate using the product rule:

This transforms the original differential equation into the separable form
 
or
 
which can now be integrated directly:  equals the antiderivative of the right-hand side (see ordinary differential equation).

Special case

A first order differential equation of the form (are all constants)

where 

Homogeneous linear differential equations

A linear differential equation is  homogeneous if it is a homogeneous linear equation in the unknown function and its derivatives. In order for this condition to hold, each nonzero term of the linear differential equation must depend on the unknown function or any derivative of it. A linear differential equation that fails this condition is called inhomogeneous.

Therefore, the general form of a linear homogeneous differential equation is 

where  is a differential operator, a sum of derivatives (defining the "0th derivative" as the original, non-differentiated function), each multiplied by a function  of :

where  may be constants, but not all  may be zero.

For example, the following linear differential equation is homogeneous:

whereas the following two are inhomogeneous:

The existence of a constant term is a sufficient condition for an equation to be inhomogeneous, as in the above example.

See also
 Separation of variables

Notes

References
 . (This is a good introductory reference on differential equations.)
 . (This is a classic reference on ODEs, first published in 1926.)

External links
Homogeneous differential equations at MathWorld
Wikibooks: Ordinary Differential Equations/Substitution 1

Differential equations
Ordinary differential equations